Philipp Buschor (born 12 March 1971) is a Swiss racing cyclist. He rode in the 1997 Tour de France.

References

1971 births
Living people
Swiss male cyclists
Place of birth missing (living people)